The 1895–96 Sheffield Shield season was the fourth season of the Sheffield Shield, the domestic first-class cricket competition of Australia. New South Wales won the championship.

Table

Statistics

Most Runs
Frank Iredale 469

Most Wickets
Tom McKibbin 65

References

Sheffield Shield
Sheffield Shield
Sheffield Shield seasons